Aynat may refer to the following places:

 `Aynat, a village in eastern Yemen
 Bédeilhac-et-Aynat, a commune in the Ariège department of southwestern France